Acampe, abbreviated as Acp in horticultural trade, is a genus  of monopodial, epiphytic vandaceous species of orchids, distributed from tropical Asia from India, eastwards to China and southwards to Malaysia, and the Philippines as well as from tropical Africa, Madagascar and islands of the Indian Ocean. The name Acampe was derived from the Greek word akampas, meaning "rigid", referring to the small, brittle,  inflexible flowers.

Acampe produce slow-growing, medium-sized vines that form very large vegetative masses in nature.  They are noted for their thick, leathery, distichous leaves. They produce fragrant small to medium-sized yellow flowers, barred with orange or red stripes, in a few to many-flowered racemose inflorescence. The brittle sepals and petals look alike. The ear-shaped, fringed, white labellum (lip) is saccate (sac-shaped) or has a spur, and has red markings at its base. The fleshy column is short and has two waxy pollinia.

Due to their large size and small flowers, they are rarely cultivated.

Species
Eight species are recognized as of May 2014:

 Acampe carinata (Griff.) Panigrahi - China, India, Assam, Bangladesh, Nepal, Cambodia, Laos, Myanmar, Thailand, Vietnam 
 Acampe cephalotes Lindl. - Assam, Bangladesh
 Acampe hulae Telepova - Laos, Cambodia
  Acampe joiceyana  (J.J.Sm.) Seidenf. - Myanmar, Thailand, Vietnam
 Acampe ochracea (Lindl.) Hochr. - Yunnan, Assam, Bangladesh, India, Sri Lanka, Cambodia, Laos, Myanmar, Malaysia, Thailand, Vietnam 
 Acampe pachyglossa Rchb.f. - Africa from Somalia to South Africa; Madagascar, Comoros, Mauritius, Seychelles, Réunion, Aldabra 
 Acampe praemorsa (Roxb.) Blatt. & McCann - India, Sri Lanka, Myanmar
 Acampe rigida (Buch.-Ham. ex Sm.) P.F.Hunt - China, India, Assam, Bangladesh, Nepal, Sri Lanka, Andaman Islands, Cambodia, Laos, Myanmar, Thailand, Vietnam, Malaya, Philippines

Acampe forms a few intergeneric hybrids :
 × Aracampe   (Acampe × Arachnis)
 × Vancampe (Acampe × Vanda)

References

External links 

 
Vandeae genera
Epiphytic orchids